Walter Henry Breen Jr. (September 5, 1928 – April 27, 1993) was an American numismatist, writer, and convicted child sex offender; as well as the husband of author Marion Zimmer Bradley. He was known among coin collectors for writing Walter Breen's Complete Encyclopedia of U.S. and Colonial Coins. "Breen numbers", from his encyclopedia, are widely used to attribute varieties of coins. He was also known for activity in the science fiction fan community and for his writings in defense of pederasty as a NAMbLA activist.

Early life
Breen was born in San Antonio, Texas, the son of Walter Henry Breen Sr. and Mary Helena (Nellie) Brown Mehl. He spent the first several years of his life in Texas with his parents.

At the time they met, both of Walter's parents were married to other people and living next door to each other in Parkersburg, West Virginia. Walter's father changed his own name from Walter H. Green to Breen after abandoning his wife and children to run away with Walter's mother. Later in life, Breen sometimes denied they were his birth parents and claimed to have been adopted by them as a foundling child. In reminiscences he spoke of being raised in a variety of "institutional and foster settings."

The 1940 census shows young Breen living in a Catholic orphanage in West Virginia, with his (by then) divorced mother living as a housekeeper in a Catholic church rectory less than away. Walter's father was by that time living with another woman in Chicago; for a while after their separation his mother resumed her maiden name and young Walter went by the name William Brown.

Breen strove to distinguish himself academically from a young age, attending a Catholic high school in Wheeling, West Virginia, and continued excelling academically throughout his postsecondary education. After being declared unfit for service by the United States Army Air Forces in April 1946, Breen was accepted that October with a recorded IQ of 144; following a severe beating, he was honorably discharged that December.

During his recovery, he read voluminously about rare coins and initiated correspondence with various members of the numismatics community, renewing his involvement in a hobby in which he had been actively engaged a few years earlier. Alternatively, Breen claimed that a severe head injury suffered in a World War II plane crash led to the development of his photographic memory.

He received his Bachelor of Arts in mathematics from Johns Hopkins University in 1952. He later claimed he finished four years of coursework in approximately ten months, concealing the fact that as a high-IQ teenage prodigy he had already completed two years at Georgetown University during World War II, followed by a brief stint at a small Catholic college in Texas. After graduating Phi Beta Kappa, he took a position as an auction cataloger for the New Netherland Coin Company while concurrently enrolled in pre-med courses at Columbia University, where he became a protege of the controversial psychologist and numismatist William Herbert Sheldon.

Breen had a longtime interest in studying high-IQ youth, which included taking out advertisements in the early 1960s for a projected private school for gifted children which Breen hoped to launch in New York City, a project which came to nothing in the end. William Sheldon worked closely with Breen on a number of coin-related projects in the 1950s, including the book Penny Whimsy, and although Sheldon encouraged Breen to attend medical school, he eventually distanced himself from the scientist, allegedly, per Breen in an interview, in part due to Sheldon's professed anti-Semitism.

Breen eventually enrolled in the sociology graduate program at the University of California, Berkeley, where he claimed to have researched "the Beat Generation groups on both coasts but also some of the very earliest hippies, finding out incidentally that some ideas that the bunch of us had developed in science fiction fandom had gotten into the hippie subculture and were being paraded around as their own inventions." He received his M.A. in the sociology of music from the institution in 1966.

Writings
In 1951, the journal Numismatist published his earliest numismatics writings. Two years later he completed his first book on American coins, Proof Coins Struck by the United States Mint, 1817–1901.

Breen also spent considerable time compiling information on the history of homosexuality and pederasty. His research, unprecedented in its extensive treatment of the history but not adhering to the standards of scholarly research, formed the basis for his 1964 book Greek Love, which he published under the pseudonym "J.Z. Eglinton". Breen collaborated with Warren Johansson in researching the book. He dedicated the book to his wife, Marion Zimmer Bradley (unnamed in the dedication), who edited it. He also published a journal, The International Journal of Greek Love, under the same pseudonym.
As "Eglinton" Breen made an appearance and spoke at the founding convention of NAMBLA in 1978.

His other interests included dirty limericks and fortune cookies. He self-published monographs on both subjects.

Arrests and convictions
Breen was initially convicted of child molestation or lewd behavior in Atlantic City in 1954, resulting in a probationary sentence. During science fiction fandom's "Breendoggle" of 1963–1964, Breen was banned from attending Pacificon II and briefly blackballed from the subculture's main amateur press association after allegations of further sex crimes surfaced. Nevertheless, prominent fans of the era such as John Boardman dismissed the allegations as hearsay and "character assassination," and the scandal blew over. Shortly thereafter, Breen married Bradley, who was cognizant of his behavior but chose not to report him. A further molestation conviction may have occurred in 1964.

Breen was again arrested on child molestation charges in 1990. He accepted a plea bargain, which resulted in three years' probation.

A year later, he was charged with eight felony counts of child molestation involving a 13-year-old boy. Though diagnosed with liver cancer in 1992, he was sentenced to 10 years in prison. He died in prison in Chino, California on April 27, 1993.

In 2014, Breen's daughter Moira Greyland revealed that she was one of the people who reported her father for child molestation.

Personal life
In addition to his employment with First Coinvestors, Inc., where he was an officer for many years, Breen was an active member of the science fiction fan community for much of his life. He wrote for fanzines, and took over editorship of the fanzine Fanac from Terry Carr and Ron Ellik.

He married science fiction writer Marion Zimmer Bradley on June 3, 1964, her 34th birthday. They had two children and separated in 1979. After their separation, Breen moved to Oakland, California. Bradley remained his principal employer. They officially divorced on May 9, 1990.

He regularly wore his Phi Beta Kappa key as a zipper pull on the fly of his pants. He joined Mensa in 1958 or 1959, possibly the first American to do so.

A user of marijuana and LSD, Breen believed in reincarnation, often recounting putative past lives in Atlantis, ancient Greece, and other mythological and historical epochs.

Selected publications
Walter Breen's Complete Encyclopedia of U.S. and Colonial Coins New York: Doubleday, 1988.
Walter Breen's Encyclopedia of United States Half Cents 1793–1857 South Gate: American Institute of Numismatic Research, 1983.
California Pioneer Fractional Gold: Historic gold rush small change 1852–1856 and suppressed jewelers' issues 1859–1882 (with Ronald Gillio)  Santa Barbara: Pacific Coast Auction Galleries, 1983.
The Encyclopedia of United States Silver & Gold Commemorative Coins 1892 to 1954 (with Anthony Swiatek) New York: Arco Pub./F.C.I. Press, 1981.
The Darkover Concordance: A Reader's Guide Berkeley: Pennyfarthing Press, 1979.
Walter Breen's Encyclopedia of United States and Colonial Proof Coins, 1722- 1977 New York: Arco Pub./F.C.I. Press, 1977.
The Gemini Problem: A Study in Darkover (chapbook) Baltimore: T.K. Graphics, 1975.
The Minting Process: How Coins are Made and Mismade Los Angeles: American Institute of Professional Numismatists, 1970.
Greek Love (as J.Z. Eglinton, with Warren Johansson) New York: Oliver Layton Press, 1964.
Dies & Coinage New York: QWERTYUIOPress, 1962.
Penny Whimsy: A Revision of Early American Cents 1793-1814, An Exercise in Descriptive Classification with Tables of Rarity and Value (with William Herbert Sheldon and Dorothy I. Paschal) New York: Durst Publications, 1958.
Lusty Limericks & Bawdy Ballads (monograph self-published in 1956)

References

Further reading
Mader, Donald, "Walter Breen aka J.Z. Eglinton 1928–1993" in Before Stonewall:  Activists for Gay and Lesbian Rights in Historical Context. Bullough, Vern L. ed. New York, London, Oxford: Harrington Park Press, 2002, .
Confronting Breen, at CoinWeek
About the "Breendoggle" at the 1964 World Science Fiction Convention (World Con):

External links
Newman Numismatic Portal
 Confronting Breen at CoinWeek

1928 births
1993 deaths
Writers from San Antonio
American numismatists
American people convicted of child sexual abuse
Deaths from liver cancer
American people who died in prison custody
Prisoners who died in California detention
Deaths from cancer in California
Johns Hopkins University alumni
Pedophile advocacy
UC Berkeley College of Letters and Science alumni
20th-century American historians
20th-century American male writers
United States Army Air Forces soldiers
American male non-fiction writers
Historians from Texas